Prince Attakora-Gyimah (born 25 December 1990 in Berekum) is a Ghanaian footballer, who is currently playing for Berekum Chelsea in the Ghanaian Premiership.

Career
Attakora-Gyimah began his career on youth side by Berekum Arsenal and joined in summer 2009 to Kessben F.C. After the dissolution of Kessben F.C. in December 2010 signed for BA Stars.

International career 
He was part of the Ghana Team at the Under-17 World Cup Finals, in Korea 2007.

References

1990 births
Living people
Ghanaian footballers
Association football forwards
People from Berekum
Berekum Arsenal players
Medeama SC players
Accra Hearts of Oak S.C. players
Berekum Chelsea F.C. players
BA Stars F.C. players